James Crowdy (1794 – April 17, 1867) was an English-born official in Newfoundland. He was Speaker of the House of Assembly of Newfoundland and Labrador from 1843-48.

Crowdy served as clerk of the Council and colonial secretary for Cape Breton Island from 1814–20, when it became part of Nova Scotia. In 1831, with his wife Elizabeth, he came to St. John's as clerk of the Council and colonial secretary for Newfoundland. In 1832, he was named to the colony's Council.

In 1836, Crowdy failed to ensure that the great seal was attached to the election writs issued in that year, which led to the invalidation of the results of the election and undermined the authority of representative government in the colony. This was viewed with suspicion since Crowdy was opposed to representative government in Newfoundland. Around the same time, he married Caroline Augusta, the daughter of John Dunscombe; his first wife had died in 1836.

In 1843, the elected assembly and appointed Council were combined and Crowdy was elected speaker. The assembly and Council became separate bodies again in 1848 and Crowdy was again named to the Council. He served briefly as colonial administrator in 1852. Crowdy resigned from the Council in 1855 and returned to England, where he died in 1867 at Newton Abbot, Devon.

References

External links

Speakers of the Newfoundland and Labrador House of Assembly
Newfoundland Colony people
1794 births
1867 deaths
Place of birth unknown